James Price Johnson (February 1, 1894 – November 17, 1955) was an American pianist and composer. A pioneer of stride piano, he was one of the most important pianists in the early era of recording, and like Jelly Roll Morton, one of the key figures in the evolution of ragtime into what was eventually called jazz. Johnson was a major influence on Count Basie, Duke Ellington, Art Tatum, and Fats Waller, who was his student.

Johnson composed many hit songs, including the unofficial anthem of the Roaring Twenties, "The Charleston," and he remained the acknowledged king of New York jazz pianists through most of the 1930s. Johnson's artistry, influence on early popular music, and contributions to musical theatre are often overlooked, and as such, he has been referred to by musicologist David Schiff as "The Invisible Pianist."

Biography
Johnson was born in New Brunswick, New Jersey, United States. The proximity to New York City meant that the full cosmopolitan spectrum of the city's musical experience, from bars, to cabarets, to the symphony, were at the young Johnson's disposal. Johnson's father, William H. Johnson, was a store helper and mechanic while his mother, Josephine Harrison, was a maid. Harrison was a part of the choir at the Methodist Church and was also a self-taught pianist. Johnson later cited the popular African American songs and dances he heard at home and around the city as early influences on his musical taste. In 1908, Johnson's family moved to the San Juan Hill (near where Lincoln Center stands today) section of New York City and subsequently moved again to uptown in 1911. With perfect pitch and excellent recall he was soon able to pick out the piano tunes that he had heard.

Johnson grew up listening to the ragtime of Scott Joplin and always retained links to the ragtime era, playing and recording Joplin's "Maple Leaf Rag", as well as the more modern (according to Johnson) and demanding "Euphonic Sounds", both several times in the 1940s. Johnson, who gained his first job as a pianist in 1912, decided to pursue his musical career rather than return to school. From 1913 to 1916, Johnson spent time studying the European piano tradition with Bruto Giannini. Over the next four to five years, Johnson continued to develop his ragtime piano skills by studying other pianists and composing his own rags.

In 1914, while performing in Newark, New Jersey with singer Lillie Mae Wright, who became his wife three years later, Johnson met Willie "The Lion" Smith. Smith and Johnson shared many of the same ideas regarding entertainers and their stage appearance. These beliefs and their complementary personalities led the two to become best friends. Starting in 1918, Johnson and Wright began touring together in the Smart Set Revue before settling back in New York in 1919.

Before 1920, Johnson had gained a reputation as a pianist on the East coast on a par with Eubie Blake and Luckey Roberts and made dozens of player piano roll recordings initially documenting his own ragtime compositions before recording for Aeolian, Perfection (the label of the Standard Music Roll Co., Orange, NJ), Artempo (label of Bennett & White, Inc., Newark, NJ), Rythmodik, and QRS during the period from 1917 to 1927. During this period he met George Gershwin, who was also a young piano-roll artist at Aeolian.

Johnson was a pioneer in the stride playing of the jazz piano. "Stride piano has often been described as an orchestral style and indeed, in contrast to boogie-woogie blues piano playing, it requires a fabulous conceptual independence, the left hand differentiating bass and mid-range lines while the right supplies melodic issues." Johnson honed his craft, playing night after night, catering to the egos and idiosyncrasies of the many singers he encountered, which necessitated being able to play a song in any key. He developed into a sensitive and facile accompanist, the favorite accompanist of Ethel Waters and Bessie Smith. Waters wrote in her autobiography that working with musicians such as, and most especially, Johnson "made you want to sing until your tonsils fell out".

As his piano style continued to evolve, his 1921 phonograph recordings of his own compositions, "Harlem Strut", "Keep Off the Grass",  "Carolina Shout", and " Worried and Lonesome Blues"  were, along with Jelly Roll Morton's Gennett recordings of 1923, among the first jazz piano solos to be put on record. Johnson seemed to be at his finest when he attacked the piano as if it were a drum set. These technically challenging compositions would be learned by his contemporaries, and would serve as test pieces in solo competitions, in which the New York pianists would demonstrate their mastery of the keyboard, as well as the swing, harmonies, and improvisational skills which would further distinguish the great masters of the era.

The majority of his phonograph recordings of the 1920s and early 1930s were done for Black Swan (founded by Johnson's friend W.C. Handy, where William Grant Still served in an A&R capacity) and Columbia. In 1922, Johnson branched out and became the musical director for the revue Plantation Days. This revue took him to England for four months in 1923. During the summer of 1923, Johnson, along with the help of lyricist Cecil Mack, wrote the revue Runnin' Wild. This revue stayed on tour for more than five years as well as showing on Broadway.

In the Depression era, Johnson's career slowed down somewhat. As the swing era began to gain popularity within the African American communities, Johnson had a hard time adapting, and his music would ultimately become unpopular. The cushion of a modest but steady income from his royalties as a composer  allowed him to devote significant time to the furtherance of his education, as well as the realization of his desire to compose "serious" orchestral music. Johnson began to write for musical revues, and composed many now-forgotten orchestral music pieces. Although by this time, he was an established composer, with a significant body of work, as well as a member of ASCAP, he was nonetheless unable to secure the financial support that he sought from either the Rosenwald Foundation or a Guggenheim Fellowship; he had received endorsement for each from Columbia Records executive and long-time admirer John Hammond. The Johnson archives include the letterhead of an organization called Friends of James P. Johnson, ostensibly founded at the time (presumably in the late 1930s) in order to promote his then-idling career. Names on the letter-head included Paul Robeson, Fats Waller, Walter White (President of the NAACP), the actress Mercedes Gilbert and Bessye Bearden, the mother of artist Romare Bearden. In the late 1930s, Johnson slowly started to re-emerge with the revival of interest in traditional jazz and began to record, with his own and other groups, at first for the H.R.S. label. Johnson's appearances at the Spirituals to Swing concerts at Carnegie Hall in 1938 and 1939 were organized by John Hammond, for whom he recorded a substantial series of solo and band sides in 1939.

Johnson suffered a stroke (likely a transient ischemic attack or mini-stroke) in August 1940. When Johnson returned to action, in 1942, he began a heavy schedule of performing, composing, and recording, leading several small live and groups, now often with racially integrated bands led by musicians such as Eddie Condon, Yank Lawson, Sidney de Paris, Sidney Bechet, Rod Cless, and Edmond Hall. In 1944, Johnson and Willie "The Lion" Smith participated in stride piano contests in Greenwich Village from August to December. He recorded for jazz labels including Asch, Black & White, Blue Note, Commodore, Circle, and Decca. In 1945, Johnson performed with Louis Armstrong and heard his works at Carnegie Hall and Town Hall in New York City. He was a regular guest star and featured soloist on Rudi Blesh's This is Jazz broadcasts, as well as at Eddie Condon's Town Hall concerts and studied with Maury Deutsch, who could also count Django Reinhardt and Charlie Parker among his pupils.

In the late 1940s, Johnson had a variety of jobs, including jam sessions at Stuyvesant Casino and Central Plaza, as well as becoming a regular on Rudi Blesh's radio show. In 1949 as an 18-year-old, actor and band leader Conrad Janis put together a band of musicians, consisting of James P. Johnson (piano), Henry Goodwin (trumpet), Edmond Hall (clarinet), Pops Foster (bass) and Baby Dodds (drums), with Janis on trombone. Johnson permanently retired from performing after suffering a severe, paralyzing stroke in 1951. Johnson survived financially on his songwriting royalties while he was paralyzed. He died four years later in Jamaica, New York and is buried in Mount Olivet Cemetery in Maspeth, Queens. Perfunctory obituaries appeared in even The New York Times. The pithiest and most angry remembrance of Johnson was written by John Hammond and appeared in DownBeat under the title "Talents of James P. Johnson Went Unappreciated".

Composer
Johnson composed many hit tunes in his work for the musical theatre, including "Charleston". It debuted in his Broadway show Runnin' Wild in 1923, although by some accounts Johnson had written it years earlier. It became one of the most popular songs of the "Roaring Twenties". He also wrote "If I Could Be With You (One Hour Tonight)", "You've Got to Be Modernistic", "Don't Cry, Baby", "Keep off the Grass", "Old Fashioned Love", "A Porter's Love Song to a Chambermaid", "Carolina Shout", and "Snowy Morning Blues". He wrote waltzes, ballet, symphonic pieces and light opera; many of these extended works exist in manuscript form in various stages of completeness in the collection of Johnson's papers housed at the Institute of Jazz Studies, Rutgers University, Newark, New Jersey. Johnson's success as a popular composer qualified him as a member of ASCAP in 1926.

Premiered in 1928, Johnson's Yamekraw, a Negro Rhapsody, was named after a black community in Savannah, Georgia. William Grant Still was orchestrator and Fats Waller the pianist as Johnson was contractually obliged to conduct his and Waller's hit Broadway show Keep Shufflin. Harlem Symphony, composed during the 1930s, was performed at Carnegie Hall in 1945 with Johnson at the piano and Joseph Cherniavsky as conductor. He collaborated with Langston Hughes on the one-act opera, De Organizer. A fuller list of Johnson's film scores appears below.

Pianist
Along with Fats Waller and Willie 'The Lion' Smith ('The Big Three'), and Luckey Roberts, Johnson embodies the Harlem Stride piano style, an evolution of East Coast ragtime infused with elements of the blues. His "Carolina Shout" was a standard test piece and rite of passage for every contemporary pianist: Duke Ellington learned it note for note from the 1921 QRS Johnson piano roll. Johnson taught Fats Waller and got him his first piano roll and recording assignments.

Harlem Stride is distinguished from ragtime by several essential characteristics: ragtime introduced sustained syncopation into piano music, but stride pianists built a more freely swinging rhythm into their performances, with a certain degree of anticipation of the left (bass) hand by the right (melody) hand, a form of tension and release in the patterns played by the right hand, interpolated within the beat generated by the left. Stride more frequently incorporates elements of the blues, as well as harmonies more complex than usually found in the works of classic ragtime composers. Lastly, while ragtime was for the most part a composed music, based on European light classics such as marches, pianists such as Waller and Johnson introduced their own rhythmic, harmonic and melodic figures into their performances and, occasionally, spontaneous improvisation. As the second generation stride pianist Dick Wellstood observed, in liner notes for recordings by the stride pianist Donald Lambert, most of the stride pianists of the 1920s, 1930s and 1940s were not particularly good improvisers. Rather, they would play their own, very well worked out, and often rehearsed variations on popular songs of the day, with very little change from one performance to another. It was in this respect that Johnson distinguished himself from his colleagues, in that (in his own words), he "could think of a trick a minute". Comparison of many of Johnson's recordings of a given tune over the years demonstrates variation from one performance to another, characterised by respect for the melody, and reliance upon a worked out set of melodic, rhythmic, and harmonic devices, such as repeated chords, serial thirds (hence his admiration for Bach), and interpolated scales, on which the improvisations were based. This same set of variations might then appear in the performance of another tune.

Legacy
Johnson may be thought of as both the last major pianist of the classic ragtime era and the first major jazz pianist. As such, he is considered an indispensable bridge between ragtime and jazz. Johnson's musical legacy is also present in the body of work of his pupil, Thomas "Fats" Waller, as well as scores of other pianists who were influenced by him, including Art Tatum, Donald Lambert, Louis Mazetier, Pat Flowers, Cliff Jackson, Hank Duncan, Claude Hopkins, Duke Ellington, Count Basie, Don Ewell, Johnny Guarnieri, Dick Hyman, Dick Wellstood, Ralph Sutton, Joe Turner, Neville Dickie, Mike Lipskin, and Butch Thompson.

Honors and recognitions
Two Romare Bearden paintings bear the name of Johnson compositions: Carolina Shout, and Snow(y) Morning.

On September 16, 1995 the U.S. Post Office issued a James P. Johnson 32-cent commemorative postage stamp.

Johnson is buried at Mount Olivet Cemetery in Maspeth, Queens County, New York.  Unmarked since his death in 1955, his grave was re-consecrated in 2009 with a headstone paid for with funds raised by an event arranged by the James P. Johnson Foundation, Spike Wilner and Dr. Scott Brown.

In 2020, Johnson's song "Carolina Shout" was added to the Grammy Hall of Fame.

Film scores
Johnson's compositions as film scores were used in a number of movies, which were compiled from previously written musical compositions. A partial list includes:

Album discography
 1950: Jazz, Vol. 1: South – Folkways Records
 1953: Jazz, Vol. 7: New York (1922–1934) – Folkways
 1953: Jazz, Vol. 9: Piano – Folkways
 1957: Happy harlem: James P. Johnson Quartet with other artists (Lil Armstrong, The Lion's Jazz Band, and The Spirits of Rhythm) - Guilde du Jazz (French Label- 10")
 1960: Jazz of the Forties, Vol. 1: Jazz at Town Hall – Folkways
 1961: A History of Jazz: The New York Scene – Folkways
 1964: The Piano Roll – Folkways
 1966: The Asch Recordings, 1939 to 1947 – Vol. 1: Blues, Gospel, and Jazz – Folkways
 1973: The Original James P. Johnson – Folkways
 1974: James P. Johnson 1921–1926 – Olympic Records
 1974: Toe Tappin' Ragtime – Folkways
 1977: Early Ragtime Piano – Folkways
 1981: Striding in Dixieland – Folkways
 1981: Giants of Jazz: James P. Johnson – Time-Life (three-record box set)
 1996: The Original James P. Johnson: 1942–1945, Piano Solos – Smithsonian Folkways
 2001: Every Tone a Testimony – Smithsonian Folkways
 2008: Classic Piano Blues from Smithsonian Folkways – Smithsonian Folkways

CD re-issues
Multiple CDs of Johnson's recordings have been released. Father of the Stride Piano, on CBS / Sony, is a re-issue of the 1962 Columbia album, featuring unissued band sides and solos from the 1930s, as well as several solos from the 1920s, including "Carolina Shout".  By far, the most complete CD collections of his work, including alternate takes, has been produced by Michael Cuscuna and his associates at Mosaic Records. The Blue Note sessions are discussed below. Mosaic's Classic James P. Johnson Sessions, 1921-1944, includes all of Johnson's piano solos, band sides, and blues accompaniments, done during this period, for the major commercial labels, exclusive of Decca/Brunswick, and RCA Victor. James P. also featured prominently in Mosaic re-issues of the Commodore label (under Max Kaminsky's name) and the HRS label (Pee Wee Russells's Rhythm Makers). The French Classics series included eight discs devoted to Johnson, and cover the period from 1921-1947. The Decca CD, Snowy Morning Blues, contains 20 sides recorded for the Brunswick and Decca labels, between 1930 and 1944. This CD includes an eight-tune Fats Waller Memorial set, and two solos, "Jingles", and "You've Got to be Modernistic", which demonstrate Johnson's hard swinging stride style. The LP, and CD, Father of the Stride Piano, collects some of Johnson's best recordings for the Columbia family of labels, done between 1921 and 1939. It includes "Carolina Shout", "Worried and Lonesome Blues", and "Hungry Blues" (from De Organizer).

Johnson's complete Blue Note recordings (solos, band sides in groups led by himself as well as Edmond Hall and Sidney DeParis) were issued in a collection by Mosaic Records and, later, in a 2CD selection in 1998 entitled The Blue Note Jazzmen. Johnson's recordings was compiled in the Giants of Jazz series by Time-Life Music. This three-LP collection contains 40 sides recorded from 1921 to 1945, and is supplemented with extensive liner notes, including a biographical essay by Frank Kappler, and criticism of the musical selections by Dick Wellstood, and the musicologist, Willa Rouder. Many of Johnson's approximately 60 piano rolls, recorded between 1917 and 1927, have been issued on CD on the Biograph label. A book of musical transcriptions of Johnson's piano roll performances of his own compositions has been prepared by Dr. Robert Pinsker, to be published through the auspices of the James P. Johnson Foundation.

References

Further reading and listening
Schiff, David: A Pianist with Harlem on His Mind, The New York Times, February 16, 1992 (A portrait and review of the re-premier of Johnson's Harlem Symphony, among other works, as realized by conductor Marin Alsop, pianist Leslie Stifleman, and The Concordia Orchestra.)
 Scott E. Brown, A Case of Mistaken Identity: The Life and Music of James P. Johnson, Scarecrow Press, 1984.  (Part of a series published by the Institute of Jazz Studies at Rutgers University. This remains the only book-length biography of Johnson. It began as Dr. Brown's senior thesis at Yale, 1982, and was expanded into book form while he was in medical school. An updated edition is in preparation. It is supplemented with an extensive pre-CD era discography by Robert Hilbert.)
 Good Buddies: Waller and Johnson, Jazz Rhythm Program No. 174, www.jazzhotbigstep.com, 2004 (produced by Dave Radlauer, with guest, Mark Borowsky, James P. Johnson Foundation)
 Celebrating James P. Johnson, Jazz Rhythm Programs No. 137 138, 139, www.jazzhotbigstep.com, 2003 (produced by Dave Radlauer, with guest, Mark Borowsky, James P. Johnson Foundation)
 Todd Mundt Show, Radio Program, NPR, January 2, 2003 (Includes a 25-minute interview with Mark Borowsky of the James P. Johnson Foundation and a discussion about the discovery and performance of Johnson and Langston Hughes' operetta, De-Organizer. Long thought to have been lost, a score of singing parts was discovered by the University of Michigan jazz pianist and scholar, Prof James Dapogny. Dapogny's restoration was performed in 2003, followed in 2006 by a Dapogny restored version of "Dreamy Kid".)
 Fats Waller and James P. Johnson: Student/Teacher, Protege/Master, Colleagues/Best Friends. Lecture, by Dr. Mark Borowsky, Dr. Robert Pinsker, James P. Johnson Foundation. Fats Waller Centennial Conference, Institute of Jazz Studies, Rutgers University, May 8, 2004.
From Joplin to Blake to Johnson: A Ragtime Triple Play. Lecture, by Robert Pinsker, Mark Borowsky, James P. Johnson Foundation. Sutter Creek Ragtime Festival, August 2002
 BBC Radio 3 Composer of the Week, 9-13 November, 2020

External links
 James P. Johnson on RedHotJazz.com Biography with RAM files of many of James P. Johnson's historic recordings
 James P. Johnson on BlueBlackJazz.com
 James P. Johnson: A Composer Rescued – The story of the discovery of "Victory Stride" and James P. Johnson's other lost symphonies by Leslie Stifleman
 Institute of Jazz Studies page on the James P. Johnson archival collection housed there
James P. Johnson Collection Music Manuscripts Institute of Jazz Studies, Dana Library, Rutgers University, Newark, NJ.
James P. Johnson Collection Programs, Scripts and Books Institute of Jazz Studies, Dana Library, Rutgers University, Newark, NJ.
 Institute of Jazz Studies Fats Waller Centennial Conference
 "In Search of James P. Johnson" by Ethan Iverson

 James P. Johnson recordings at the Discography of American Historical Recordings.
 
 
Scott E. Brown M.D., liner note excerpt Mosaic Records: Classic James P. Johnson Sessions (1921-1943)

Dixieland jazz musicians
Stride pianists
Ragtime pianists
African-American jazz pianists
African-American jazz composers
Ragtime composers
Blue Note Records artists
Musicians from New Brunswick, New Jersey
1894 births
1955 deaths
20th-century jazz composers
20th-century American pianists
20th-century American composers
American male pianists
American male jazz composers
American jazz composers
20th-century American male musicians
McKinney's Cotton Pickers members
20th-century African-American musicians
Burials at Mount Olivet Cemetery (Queens)